Tomohisa is a masculine Japanese given name.

Possible writings
Tomohisa can be written using different combinations of kanji characters. Some examples:

友久, "friend, long time"
友尚, "friend, still"
友寿, "friend, long life"
友悠, "friend, calm/distant"
知久, "know, long time"
知尚, "know, still"
知寿, "know, long life"
知悠, "know, calm/distant"
智久, "intellect, long time"
智尚, "intellect, still"
智寿, "intellect, long life"
智悠, "intellect, calm/distant"
共久, "together, long time"
共尚, "together, still"
朋久, "companion, humanity"
朋尚, "companion, still"
朝久, "morning/dynasty, long time"
朝尚, "morning/dynasty, still"
朝寿, "morning/dynasty, long life"
朝悠, "morning/dynasty, calm/distant"

The name can also be written in hiragana ともひさ or katakana トモヒサ.

Notable people with the name
, Japanese footballer
, Japanese baseball player
, Japanese baseball player
, Japanese idol, actor and singer
, Japanese footballer
, Japanese actor

See also
9100 Tomohisa, a main-belt asteroid

Japanese masculine given names